Van Dyke brown is a printing process named after Anthony van Dyck.

It involves coating a canvas with ferric ammonium citrate, tartaric acid, and silver nitrate, then exposing it to ultraviolet light. The canvas can be washed with water, and hypo to keep the solutions in place.  The image created has a Van Dyke brown color when it's completed, and unlike other printing methods, does not require a darkroom. 

The Van Dyke brown process was patented in Germany in 1895 by Arndt and Troost. It was originally called many different names, such as sepia print or brown print. It has even been called kallitype, however that process uses ferric oxalate instead of ferric ammonium citrate.

Concerns have been voiced about the archival qualities of the Van Dyke brown print due to the fact that many early Van Dyke brown prints did not last long. However, if properly processed, Van Dyke brown prints should last as long as any other silver process.

References

History of printing